Home Movie: The Princess Bride is an American comedy miniseries directed by Jason Reitman, a "fan made" recreation of the 1987 film The Princess Bride. Produced while the participating actors were isolating themselves during the COVID-19 pandemic in the United States, it is filmed in a deliberately DIY fashion, with an ensemble cast recording their scenes on their own smartphones, and multiple actors playing the most prominent roles. It features the final screen performance of Carl Reiner, the father of the original film's director Rob Reiner. It premiered in short installments in June and July 2020, on Quibi.

Plot

The Home Movie version of the film follows the same fundamental plot. In contemporary times, a grandfather reads the story of The Princess Bride to his dismissive sick grandson. In the story, set in medieval times in the fictional country of Florin, Buttercup and her farmhand Westley fall in love. Westley goes off to seek his fortune to marry Buttercup but she soon learns of his death at the hands of the Dread Pirate Roberts, and comes to accept the marriage proposal of Prince Humperdinck. Near her wedding day, three scoundrels, Vizzini, Inigo Montoya, and Fezzik, abduct Buttercup at the request of Humperdinck to make it appear as an act from a neighboring kingdom and pretense to start a war. They are chased by the Man in Black, later revealed to be the Dread Pirate Roberts. Roberts beats and spares Inigo and Fezzik, and survives a poison challenge from Vizzini to free Buttercup. He reveals that he is actually Westley, that the "Dread Pirate Roberts" is a title passed along from one holder to the next, and that he had come after hearing that Buttercup's life is in danger. The two are soon caught by Humperdinck and Count Tyrone Rugen.

Humperdinck returns Buttercup to the castle to prepare for the wedding, claiming that Westley returned to the sea, when in reality, Rugen has taken Westley to be tortured in a secret chamber. When Buttercup refused to show any love for Humperdinck, Humperdinck uses Rugen's torture device to apparently kill Westley. Inigo and Fezzik, having reunited near the castle, hear Westley's final screams, discover his body, and take him to Miracle Max. Max finds Westley clings to life due to his true love for Buttercup and helps resuscitate him. Westley, still half-prone from being nearly dead, devises a plan with Inigo and Fezzik to interrupt the wedding to rescue Buttercup. Inigo, learning that Rugen is his father's killer, gets revenge by killing Rugen after a long fight. Fezzik helps Westley to Buttercup's room. Westley wounds Humperdinck to shame him before he, Buttercup, and Fezzik flee with Inigo. The grandson, who had told the grandfather to skip all the kissing parts in the book before, allows him to read the final kissing scene in the book.

Cast
 The Grandson: Josh Gad, Mckenna Grace, Keith L. Williams, Logan Kim, Joey King, Rob Reiner, and Fred Savage (who played the Grandson in the 1987 movie).
 The Grandfather: Rob Reiner, J. K. Simmons, Giancarlo Esposito, Sarah Silverman, Roman Mars, Robert Wuhl, Adam Sandler, and Carl Reiner.
 Mother: Retta
 Westley/The Man in Black/Dread Pirate Roberts: Chris Pine, Common, Sam Rockwell, Neil Patrick Harris, Sophie Turner, David Spade, Jon Hamm, Kaitlyn Dever, Brandon Routh, Courtney Ford, Tommy Dewey, Taika Waititi, Christopher Mintz-Plasse, Jack Black, Lucas Hedges, Paul Rudd, and Cary Elwes (in reused footage from the 1987 film). 
 Princess Buttercup: Tiffany Haddish, Penélope Cruz, Jennifer Garner, Leslie Bibb, David Burtka, Annabelle Wallis, Zoe Saldana, Joe Jonas, Mackenzie Davis,  Kimberly Brook, Zazie Beetz, Alice Oswalt, Brandon Routh, Courtney Ford, Zoey Deutch, Jenna Ortega, Beanie Feldstein and Robin Wright (in reused footage from the 1987 film).
 Prince Humperdinck: Hugh Jackman, Thomas Lennon, Penélope Cruz, Elijah Wood, José Andrés, Don Johnson, Ernie Hudson, Dennis Haysbert, James Van Der Beek, David Oyelowo, and Cary Elwes (who played Westley in the 1987 film).
 Inigo Montoya: Diego Luna, Oscar Nunez, Finn Wolfhard, Javier Bardem, Keegan-Michael Key, Nick Kroll, Sarah Cooper, Catherine Reitman, John Cho, Natalie Morales, and Pedro Pascal.
 Fezzik: Dave Bautista, Brian Baumgartner, Nick Kroll, Shaquille O'Neal, Catherine Reitman, Zoey Deutch, Craig Robinson, Charlize Theron, and Jason Segel.
 Vizzini: Patton Oswalt, Angela Kinsey, Nick Kroll, Rainn Wilson, and King Bach.
 Count Rugen: Meredith Salenger, Oliver Lennon, Stephen Merchant, B. J. Novak, Bryan Cranston, and Andy Serkis.
 Miracle Max: Seth Rogen
 Valerie: Ari Graynor
 The Impressive Clergyman: John Malkovich
 The Albino: Nicholas Braun 
 The Ancient Booer: Jennifer Garner
 Yellen the Messenger: Richard Speight Jr.
 R.O.U.S.: Leo James Routh

Production
Reitman came up with the idea in March 2020, early in the COVID-19 pandemic quarantine, of remaking the 1987 film The Princess Bride with actors performing in their own homes. He saw it as a way to raise money for World Central Kitchen to support restaurants that were also struggling under the pandemic, allowing them to operate and provide meals to poor families. Reitman talked to Jeffrey Katzenberg about it, who made a million-dollar donation to the charity, and arranged to stream the final product on the upcoming Quibi streaming service. Reitman created a proof of concept scene with himself and his daughter recreating the initial scene with the grandfather and the boy that leads off the film, and used that to gain approval from Norman Lear, who owned the rights to the film, and the estate of William Goldman, which controlled the rights to the original story. Reitman was also able to get the rights to the film's score from Mark Knopfler.

The series was filmed by the actors at their homes during quarantine. Actors provided their own props and costumes, and swapped roles between scenes. Each actor filmed their own side of a scene in isolation, due to social distancing guidelines, with the exception of cohabitating couples such as Chris Pine and Annabelle Wallis, Common and Tiffany Haddish, Sam Rockwell and Leslie Bibb, Neil Patrick Harris and David Burtka, Brandon Routh and Courtney Ford, and Sophie Turner and Joe Jonas, who filmed their scenes together. Special effects were created in a humorously homemade manner; sets were recreated in miniature form with LEGO and an R.O.U.S. ("rodent of unusual size") is represented by Sophie Turner's corgi. Reitman provided minimal direction to the actors outside of answering a few questions.

Fred Savage plays the grandson in the opening scene, making him the only actor from the original film to reprise his original role. Cary Elwes, who starred as Westley in the original film, appears in the final confrontation between Westley and Humperdinck, but instead plays Humperdinck (opposite Paul Rudd). Rob Reiner, director of the original film, appears in the production in two roles. He is one of the actors playing the grandfather in the opening bookend scene, reading the film's fairy-tale story to his grandson (played in this segment by Josh Gad). He also appears in the closing bookend scene as the grandson, with his father Carl Reiner now playing the loving grandfather and speaking the film's catchphrase "as you wish" (which means "I love you"). Carl Reiner died three days after recording his scene, and the work as a whole is dedicated to him.

Mark Knopfler's score is performed by Ethan Gruska, Blake Mills, Bad Suns, Mateo Messina, Phoebe Bridgers, Bahamas, Sylvan Esso, Alex Ebert, Beulahbelle, and Perfume Genius.

Release 
The series was announced on June 26, 2020. The film was released in short segments – the Quibi service's usual format – with the first installment appearing on June 29.

Episodes

References

External links
 

2020 American television series debuts
2020s American comedy television series
English-language television shows
Impact of the COVID-19 pandemic on television
The Princess Bride
Quibi original programming
Cultural responses to the COVID-19 pandemic